The Hanau shootings occurred on 19 February 2020, when eleven people were killed and five others wounded in a terrorist shooting spree by a schizophrenic far-right extremist targeting a shisha bar, a bar and a kiosk in Hanau, near Frankfurt, Hesse, Germany. After the attacks, the gunman returned to his apartment, where he killed his mother and then committed suicide. The massacre was called an act of terrorism by the German Minister of Internal Affairs.

Shootings 
The shootings took place at around 22:00 local time (UTC+1) on 19 February 2020, in two bars—one at the Midnight Bar in Hanau's central square, and the other at the Arena Bar & Café in Kesselstadt.  The attacker first started aiming at three guests, followed by the waiter who had just served them. The police initiated a large-scale investigation. It was initially reported that the suspects were at large. The gunman, later identified as Tobias Rathjen, then drove home, where he shot his mother while his father was able to escape. Rathjen then shot himself. He and his mother were discovered by police at 05:15 the next day when they gained entry.

Victims 
The nine people killed by the attacker during the two shootings were identified as: four Germans Gökhan Gültekin (37), Ferhat Unvar (23), Mercedes Kierpacz (35), Said Nesar Hashemi (21) (two of whom had Kurdish origins, another of Sinti origins, and another with Afghan nationality), Sedat Gürbüz (29) and Fatih Saraçoğlu (34) two Turks, Hamza Kurtović (22) a Bosnian, Kaloyan Velkov (33) a Bulgarian, and Vili Viorel Păun (22) a Romanian. The owner of one of the shisha bars was among the victims. Three immediately died in the first shooting, five immediately died in the second, and a ninth victim died in hospital the next day. The attacker shot and killed his German mother (Gabriele Rathjen, 72) before committing suicide.

Two Turkish-Germans, an Afghan-German and a Cameroonian-German were among the five people injured.

Perpetrator 
The gunman was identified as 43-year-old Tobias Rathjen, a far-right extremist. On his personal website, he published a racist manifesto and posted videos showing his political and misogynist beliefs, accused US President Donald Trump of stealing his slogans, promoted extreme eugenics and expressed frustration that due to his psychological issues he could never experience an intimate relationship with a woman. Rathjen stated he had been guided by voices inside his head since birth and he was being followed by secret agents. In his manifesto, he expressed extreme hatred for migrants, especially for people from the Middle East, Central Asia, Southeast Asia and North Africa. He also expressed a hatred for German citizens who allowed immigrants into their country, and considered them as "impure".

According to Germany's general prosecutor Peter Frank, Rathjen had contacted German authorities with his conspiracy theories three months before the attack: on 6 November 2019, Rathjen had written a letter to the Public Prosecutor General urging action against a "secret service" organisation, which he claimed was tapping into people's brains to control world events. He called on authorities to "approach me and communicate with me". No action was taken in response. Parts of this 19-page letter were virtually identical to his 24-page manifesto published on his website in February 2020, but it was unclear whether it included any threats against ethnic minorities.

Near the Arena Bar, text linked to the perpetrator's website was found written in graffiti on a wall before it was covered over by police.

Of the weapons used in the attack, three were reportedly legally owned by the perpetrator, while another had been "borrow[ed]" from a gun trader prior to the attack.

Investigation 
Federal prosecutors are treating the attack as terrorism, with officials saying there is evidence the gunman was a far-right extremist, as well as signs of xenophobic motives for the killings. Peter Beuth, the Minister of the Interior in the state of Hesse, stated on 20 February that a website found by investigators indicated a right-wing political motive for the shootings. A letter and a video clip of a confession were reportedly discovered and are being analysed by the police.

Reactions 
As a result of the shootings, German Chancellor Angela Merkel cancelled a planned trip to Halle and expressed her condolences to the victims' families. The president of the European Parliament, David Sassoli, also offered condolences. Some Turkish citizens were among the victims of the shooting; the Turkish government described it as a form of racism and urged a prompt investigation. German president Frank-Walter Steinmeier, his wife Elke Büdenbender, and the Hesse minister-president Volker Bouffier attended a vigil at one of the shooting sites. Pope Francis extended his sympathy to the families who lost their loved ones during the shooting incident in Hanau, through the Vatican Secretary of State, Cardinal Pietro Parolin.

On 23 February, 10,000 mourners marched through the streets of Hanau, in order to show unity and support for the victims. The mayor of Hanau gave a speech to the gathering.

On 24 February, in response to the shootings, the United Kingdom proscribed Sonnenkrieg Division, the British branch of the American neo-Nazi organisation Atomwaffen Division, as a terrorist group. Another UK-based far-right organisation, System Resistance Network, was also proscribed as an alias for National Action, which had been proscribed as a terrorist organisation since 2016.

On the one year anniversary of the attack (19 February 2021), large memorial services and rallies were held in multiple cities in Germany to commemorate the victims, warn against racism and demand further action. President Frank-Walter Steinmeier attended a ceremony in Hanau condemning hate and racism while acknowledging mistakes by authorities.

In the media 
In March 2022, it was announced by filmmaker Uwe Boll that he was writing and directing a fictionalized portrayal of the shootings as a feature film. The movie, titled Hanau, has been described by the filmmaker as "an intense psychogram" of Rathjen. The independent film was expected to be released to digital streaming services Amazon Prime, Apple TV+, and Google Play in the United States and Canada in Q4 2022.

See also 
 2004 Cologne bombing
 2016 Munich shooting
 2019 Halle synagogue shooting
 List of right-wing terrorist attacks
 Murder of Michèle Kiesewetter
 National Socialist Underground murders

References

External links

2020 murders in Germany
2020 mass shootings in Europe
21st century in Hesse
Anti-Muslim violence in Europe
Attacks on buildings and structures in 2020
Attacks on buildings and structures in Germany
February 2020 crimes in Europe
February 2020 events in Germany
Hate crimes in Europe
Kurds in Germany
Mass murder in 2020
21st-century mass murder in Germany
Mass shootings in Germany
Matricides
Murder in Hesse
Neo-Nazi attacks in Germany
Spree shootings in Germany
Terrorist incidents in Germany in 2020
Murder–suicides in Germany